Einar Østby (17 September 1935 – 3 April 2022) was a Norwegian cross-country skier who competed during the early 1960s. He earned a silver in the 4 × 10 km relay at the 1960 Winter Olympics in Squaw Valley and also finished fifth in the 15 km event as well. Østby also won a bronze medal in the 15 km event at the 1962 Nordic skiing World Championships.

Østby was born in Vinger on 17 September 1935. He was also an able long distance runner. His personal best times were 14:46.2 minutes in the 5000 metres, achieved in July 1959 at Bislett stadion, and 31:01.2 minutes in the 10,000 metres, achieved in August 1962 in Drammen. He represented the club Jaren IL.

Østby died on 3 April 2022, at the age of 86.

Cross-country skiing results
All results are sourced from the International Ski Federation (FIS).

Olympic Games
 1 medal – (1 silver)

World Championships
 1 medal – (1 bronze)

References

External links
 
 

1935 births
2022 deaths
Norwegian male cross-country skiers
Olympic cross-country skiers of Norway
Olympic silver medalists for Norway
Cross-country skiers at the 1960 Winter Olympics
Cross-country skiers at the 1964 Winter Olympics
Olympic medalists in cross-country skiing
Norwegian male long-distance runners
FIS Nordic World Ski Championships medalists in cross-country skiing
Medalists at the 1960 Winter Olympics
Sportspeople from Kongsvinger